Ingela Kristina Lundbäck (born 11 May 1975) is a Swedish para table tennis player. She won a silver medal and bronze medal at the 2012 Summer Paralympics. She won a silver medal in Team C4–5, at the 2020 Summer Paralympics.

She is a seven time European para table tennis champion in both singles events and team events alongside Anna-Carin Ahlquist.

References

1975 births
Living people
Swedish female table tennis players
Paralympic table tennis players of Sweden
Table tennis players at the 2008 Summer Paralympics
Table tennis players at the 2012 Summer Paralympics
Table tennis players at the 2016 Summer Paralympics
Table tennis players at the 2020 Summer Paralympics
Medalists at the 2012 Summer Paralympics
Paralympic medalists in table tennis
Paralympic silver medalists for Sweden
Paralympic bronze medalists for Sweden
People from Luleå
Sportspeople from Norrbotten County
21st-century Swedish women